The River Murders is a 2011 American psychological crime drama film directed by Rich Cowan and starring Ray Liotta, Ving Rhames, and Christian Slater.

Plot 
Detective Jack Verdon is investigating a series of brutal murders when he realizes that each victim is a woman with whom he has slept or had a relationship with in the past. Verdon is taken off the case by FBI Agent Vukovitch and suspended by his Captain. Verdon is forced to work outside the law and confront his past to catch the killer (Michael Rodrick), who has been extracting details of Verdon's other lovers – and subsequent victims – from each victim.

The killer is revealed to be John, the son Jack never knew was born from his first girlfriend, Rebecca. When she discovered she was pregnant Jack convinced her to have an abortion. However, she never did. John kidnaps Jack's wife, but cannot bring himself to take her life when he discovers that she is pregnant. He convinces Jack that he did kill her, causing Jack to kill him.

Cast

Production 
Filming took place in the fall of 2010 in Spokane, Washington.

Release 
The River Murders premiered at the Cannes Film Festival and had a limited release in September 2011.  Sony Pictures Home Entertainment released it on DVD on September 20, 2011.

Reception 
Paul Bradshaw of Total Film rated it 2/5 stars and called it a low point for the careers of the stars.  Rohit Rao of DVD Talk rated it 1.5/5 stars and called it a "drab and generic serial killer thriller".  Paul Pritchard of DVD Verdict wrote, "As a TV movie, The River Murders would be passable, but expecting people to spend money on it is asking too much."

References

External links 
 
 

2011 films
2010s police films
2010s psychological drama films
2010s serial killer films
2010s mystery drama films
Adultery in films
American crime drama films
American police detective films
American psychological drama films
American serial killer films
Films scored by Pinar Toprak
Films shot in Washington (state)
Matricide in fiction
Films about the Federal Bureau of Investigation
2011 crime drama films
2010s English-language films
2010s American films